The Juno Awards of 1973, representing Canadian music industry achievements of the previous year, were awarded on 12 March 1973 in Toronto at a ceremony at the Inn on the Park's Centennial ballroom. Approximately 1500 people attended this event which was hosted by George Wilson of CFRB radio.

David Crombie, Toronto's mayor at that time, presented the Best Male Vocalist award to Stompin' Tom Connors. Gordon Lightfoot also made his first personal appearance at the Junos.

An associated music industry conference known as Communication 6 was held from 10 March and concluded with the Juno Award ceremonies.

Taped excerpts from the awards were broadcast on a special edition of CBC Radio's The Entertainers on 23 March 1973.

Winners

Best Female Vocalist
Winner: Anne Murray

Outstanding Performance - Female
Winner: Ginette Reno

Best Male Vocalist
Winner: Gordon Lightfoot

Outstanding Performance - Male
Winner: Bob McBride

Best Group
Winner: Lighthouse

Outstanding Performance - Group
Winner: Edward Bear

Best Songwriter
Winner: Gordon Lightfoot

Best Country Female Artist
Winner: Shirley Eikhard

Best Country Male Artist
Winner: Stompin' Tom Connors

Best Country Group or Duo
Winner: The Mercey Brothers

Folk Singer of the Year
Winner: Bruce Cockburn

Outstanding Performance - Folk
Winner: Valdy

Broadcaster of the Year
Winner: VOCM, St. Johns Newfoundland

Top Canadian Content Company of the Year
Winner: Capitol Records of Canada

Top Record Company of the Year
Winner: WEA Music of Canada Ltd.

Top Promotional Company of the Year
Winner: RCA Ltd.

Journalist of the Year
Winner: Peter Goddard

Music Industry Man of the Year
Winner: Arnold Gosewich

Contribution to Canadian music
Winner: David Clayton Thomas

Nominated and winning albums

Best Produced Album (middle of the road)
Winner: Annie, Anne Murray (produced by Brian Ahern)

Nominated and winning releases

Best Produced Single 
Winner: "Last Song", Edward Bear (produced by Gene Martynec)

References

Notes

General

External links
Juno Awards site

1973
1973 music awards
1973 in Canadian music